Middlebrook 7H10 Agar is a solid growth medium specially used for culture of Mycobacterium, notably Mycobacterium tuberculosis. It has been reported that the 7H10 medium tends to grow fewer contaminants than the egg-based media commonly used for the cultivation of mycobacteria.

Composition 
Ingredients (g/L)
 Ammonium sulfate, 0.50
 Monopotassium phosphate, 1.50
 Disodium phosphate, 1.50
 Sodium citrate, 0.40
 Magnesium sulfate, 0.025
 Zinc sulfate, 0.001
 Copper sulfate, 0.001
 L-Glutamic acid, 0.50
 Ferric ammonium citrate, 0.04
 Pyridoxine hydrochloride, 0.001
 Biotin, 0.0005
 Malachite green, 0.00025
 Agar, 15.00
 Calcium chloride, 0.0005

Cultures should be read within 5–7 days after inoculation and once a week thereafter for up to 8 weeks.

See also
 Lowenstein-Jensen medium
 Middlebrook 7H9 Broth

References

External links 
 Middlebrook 7H10 Agar

 http://www.bd.com/ds/productCenter/295964.asp

Microbiological media